Ábær is a deserted farm in Iceland, located in the municipality of Skagafjörður. A small church was opened in 1922. The farm became deserted in 1950.

References

Populated places in Northwestern Region (Iceland)